John Hawkins (25 February 1692, in Creed, Cornwall – 2 August 1733, in Cambridge) was Master of Pembroke College, Cambridge between 1728 and 1733.

Hawkins entered Pembroke College, Cambridge in 1709. He graduated B.A. in 1713, and M.A. in 1716. He became a Fellow of Pembroke, holding that post until his election as Master.

His brother Philip was M.P. for Grampound in Cornwall from 1727 to 1738.

References

1692 births
1733 deaths
People from Cornwall
People educated at Norwich School
Alumni of Pembroke College, Cambridge
Masters of Pembroke College, Cambridge
Fellows of Pembroke College, Cambridge